Lisa Angiolini (born 29 June 1995) is an Italian swimmer. She competed in the women's 200 metre breaststroke event at the 2020 European Aquatics Championships, in Budapest, Hungary. She was also part of the Italian team that won the bronze medal in the women's 4 × 200 metre freestyle relay event.

At the 2022 European Aquatics Championships, held in Rome, Angiolini won the silver medal in the 100 metre breaststroke with a time of 1:06.34, which was 0.37 seconds behind gold medalist and fellow Italian Benedetta Pilato.

References

External links
 

1995 births
Living people
Italian female freestyle swimmers
Italian female breaststroke swimmers
Place of birth missing (living people)
European Aquatics Championships medalists in swimming
Mediterranean Games medalists in swimming
Mediterranean Games gold medalists for Italy
Swimmers at the 2022 Mediterranean Games
20th-century Italian women
21st-century Italian women